The Taipei Metro Kunyang station is a station on the Bannan line located in Nangang District, Taipei, Taiwan.

Station overview
The two-level, underground station and has one island platform and four exits. It is located beneath Zhongxiao East Rd.

Public art for the station is titled "Around" and is composed of carousel horses that dance to music whenever the viewer comes near. They are located along the glass windows of the concourse level.

Station layout

Any Bannan line trains from Dingpu or Far Eastern Hospital will terminate here during non-rush hours or when they are being transferred to the Nangang Depot, otherwise they will go to Taipei Nangang Exhibition Center. It also served as the eastern terminal station of this line from 2000 to 2008 when Nangang opened for MRT service.

Exits
Exit 1: Combined Logistics Command Headquarters
Exit 2: Lane 403, Zhongxiao Rd. Sec.6
Exit 3: Nangang Senior High School
Exit 4: Kunyang St.

Around the station
 Taipei Metro Nangang Depot
 Ministry of National Defense
 Ministry of Health and Welfare
 Nangang High School
 Chengde Elementary School (between this station and Houshanpi station)
 Nangang Park

References

Railway stations opened in 2000
Bannan line stations